Bangui is the capital of and the largest city in the Central African Republic.

Bangui may also refer to:
 Bangui, Niger
 Bangui, Ilocos Norte, Philippines

See also
 Banjul, the capital of The Gambia